Georg Heinrich Bode (1802—1846) was a German classical philologist and translator. From 1820, he studied philology at the University of Göttingen. He published the three-volume Geschichte der hellenischen Dichtkunst (1838).

Works
 Orpheus poetarum Graecorum antiquissimus. Göttingen, 1824.
 Scriptores rerum mythicarum Latini tres Romae nuper reperti, 2 vols. Celle, 1834.
 Geschichte der Hellenischen Dichtkunst, 3 vols. in 5 parts. Leipzig, 1838–1840.
 Quaestiones de antiquissima carminum Orphicorum aetate patria atque indole. Göttingen, 1838.

External links
 Geschichte der hellenischen Dichtkunst

1802 births
1846 deaths
19th-century philologists
19th-century German translators